The Pokajnica Monastery (lit. "Repentance Monastery") is a monastery complex in Velika Plana, Serbia.

History
The monastery served as a parish church until 1954, when it was turned into a monastery. Originally built in 1818, the interior of the Church's iconostasis was carved by a local craftsman. 

In the churchyard there is a wooden bell tower as well as living quarters, probably from the time of construction of the church, with wooden bars on the windows. Conservation work on the church were carried out in 1951, and on the iconostasis in 1987–88. 

In 1979 the Republic of Serbia declared Pokajnica a Monument of Culture of Exceptional Importance, and as such it is protected by law.

See also
 Karađorđe
 Monument of Culture of Exceptional Importance
 Tourism in Serbia
 List of Serbian Orthodox monasteries

References

Literature
 Regional Chamber of Požarevac, prepared by Dr Radmila Novaković Kostić, 2005.

19th-century Serbian Orthodox church buildings
19th-century Christian monasteries
Serbian Orthodox monasteries in Serbia
Cultural Monuments of Exceptional Importance (Serbia)
Wooden churches
Tourist attractions in Serbia
Landmarks in Serbia
Wooden buildings and structures in Serbia
19th-century churches in Serbia